Felix Anyansi-Agwu is a Nigerian football administrator who currently serves as Chairman of Enyimba International F.C. since 1999. Under his leadership, Enyimba International has since risen from a relatively unknown club to one of Africa's most successful clubs.
He was recently appointed as the new Vice President of NFF (*
Nigerian Football Federation).

Accolades
2003 CAF Awards – African Football Manager of the Year
2004 CAF Awards – African Football Manager of the Year
1st Nigeria Pitch Awards – Manager of the Year
2nd Nigeria Pitch Awards – Manager of the Year

References

Year of birth missing (living people)
Living people
Nigerian sports executives and administrators